This is a list of people starring on American television that are the highest-paid, based on various sources.

Television series

TV and streaming salaries per episode
{| class="sortable wikitable"
|+ 
|- style="text-align:center; background:#d6d6d6;"
! Name
! Program
! Role
! Salary
! Inflation Adjusted
! Year
! 
|- style="text-align:center;"
|Jennifer Aniston
| rowspan="2" |The Morning Show
|Alex Levy
| rowspan="2" | $2 million
| rowspan="2" | $
| rowspan="2" | 2019–
| rowspan="2" |  
|- style="text-align:center;"
|Reese Witherspoon
|Bradley Jackson
|- style="text-align:center;"
|Charlie Sheen
|Two and a Half Men
|Charlie Harper
|$1.8 million
|$
|2010–11
| 
|- style="text-align:center;"
|Ray Romano
|Everybody Loves Raymond
|Raymond Barone
|$1.725 million
|$
| 2003–05
| 
|- style="text-align:center;"
|Kelsey Grammer
|Frasier
|Frasier Crane
|$1.6 million
|$
| 2002–04
| 
|- style="text-align:center;"
|Chris Pratt
|The Terminal List
|James Reece
|$1.4 million
|$
|2022–
| 
|- style="text-align:center;"
|Tim Allen
|Home Improvement|Tim Taylor
|$1.25 million
|$
| 1998–99
| 
|- style="text-align:center;"
|Jerry Seinfeld
|Seinfeld|Jerry Seinfeld
|$1 million 
|$
| 1997–98
| 
|- style="text-align:center;"
|Helen Hunt
| rowspan="2" |Mad About You|Jamie Buchman
| rowspan="2" | $1 million
| rowspan="2" | $
| rowspan="2" |1998–99
| rowspan="2" |
|- style="text-align:center;"
|Paul Reiser
|Paul Buchman
|- style="text-align:center;"
|Jennifer Aniston
| rowspan="6" |Friends|Rachel Green
| rowspan="6" | $1 million 
| rowspan="6" |$
| rowspan="6" | 2002–04
| rowspan="6" | 
|- style="text-align:center;"
|Courteney Cox
|Monica Geller
|- style="text-align:center;"
|Lisa Kudrow
|Phoebe Buffay
|- style="text-align:center;"
|Matt LeBlanc
|Joey Tribbiani
|- style="text-align:center;"
|David Schwimmer
|Ross Geller
|- style="text-align:center;"
|Matthew Perry
|Chandler Bing
|- style="text-align:center;"
|James Gandolfini
|The Sopranos|Tony Soprano
|$1 million
|$
| 2006–07
| 
|- style="text-align:center;"
|Kaley Cuoco
| rowspan="3" |The Big Bang Theory|Penny
| rowspan="3" | $1 million
| rowspan="3" | $
| rowspan="3" | 2015–17
| rowspan="3" | 
|- style="text-align:center;"
|Johnny Galecki
|Leonard Hofstadter
|- style="text-align:center;"
|Jim Parsons
|Sheldon Cooper
|- style="text-align:center;"
|Peter Dinklage
| rowspan="5" |Game of Thrones|Tyrion Lannister
| rowspan="5" | $1 million
| rowspan="5" | $
| rowspan="5" | 2017–18
| rowspan="5" | 
|- style="text-align:center;"
|Nikolaj Coster-Waldau
|Jaime Lannister
|- style="text-align:center;"
|Lena Headey
|Cersei Lannister
|- style="text-align:center;"
|Emilia Clarke
|Daenerys Targaryen
|- style="text-align:center;"
|Kit Harington
|Jon Snow
|- style="text-align:center;"
|Nicole Kidman
| rowspan="2" |Big Little Lies|Celeste Wright
| rowspan="2" | $1 million
| rowspan="2" | $
| rowspan="2" | 2019
| rowspan="2" | 
|- style="text-align:center;"
|Reese Witherspoon
|Madeline Martha Mackenzie
|- style="text-align:center;"
|Jeff Bridges
|The Old Man|Dan Chase
|$1 million
|$
|2021–
|
|- style="text-align:center;"
|Simon Helberg
| rowspan="2" |The Big Bang Theory|Howard Wolowitz
| rowspan="2" | $900,000
| rowspan="2" | $
| rowspan="2" | 2017-19
| rowspan="2" | 
|- style="text-align:center;"
|Kunal Nayyar
|Raj Koothrapali
|- style="text-align:center;"
|Roseanne Barr
| Roseanne|Roseanne Conner
|$875,000
|$
|1996-97
| 
|- style="text-align:center;"
|Ashton Kutcher
| Two and a Half Men|Walden Schmidt
|$755,000
|$
|2014
| 
|- style="text-align:center;"
|Drew Carey
|The Drew Carey Show|Drew Carey
|$750,000
|$
| 2001–04
| 
|- style="text-align:center;"
|David Hyde Pierce
|Frasier|Niles Crane
|$750,000
|$
| 2004
|
|- style="text-align:center;"
|Lauren Graham
| rowspan="2" |Gilmore Girls: A Year in the Life|Lorelai Gilmore
| rowspan="2" |$750,000
| rowspan="2" |$
| rowspan="2" |2016
| rowspan="2" |
|- style="text-align:center;"
|Alexis Bledel
|Rory Gilmore
|- style="text-align:center;"
| Bryan Cranston
| Your Honor| Michael Desiato
| $750,000
| $
| 2019–2020
| 
|- style="text-align:center;"
|Hugh Laurie
|House|Dr. Gregory House
|$700,000
|$
|2014
|
|- style="text-align:center;"
|Andrew Lincoln
|The Walking Dead|Rick Grimes
|$650,000
|$
|2017–18
|
|- style="text-align:center;"
| Kate Winslet
| Mare of Easttown| Mare Sheehan
| $650,000
| $
| 2019–2020
| 
|- style="text-align:center;"
|Jon Cryer
|Two and a Half Men|Alan Harper
| $620,000
|$
| 2013–15
|
|- style="text-align:center;"
|Julia Louis-Dreyfus
| rowspan="3" |Seinfeld|Elaine Benes
| rowspan="3" |$600,000
| rowspan="3" |$
| rowspan="3" |1997–98
| rowspan="3" |
|- style="text-align:center;"
|Jason Alexander
|George Costanza
|- style="text-align:center;"
|Michael Richards
|Cosmo Kramer
|- style="text-align:center;"
| Steve Martin
| rowspan="2" | Only Murders in the Building| Charles-Haden Savage
| rowspan="2" | $600,000
| rowspan="2" | $
| rowspan="2" | 2020–
| rowspan="6" | 
|- style="text-align:center;"
| Martin Short
| Oliver Putnam
|- style="text-align:center;"
| Gillian Anderson
| rowspan="3" | The First Lady| Eleanor Roosevelt
| rowspan="3" | $600,000
| rowspan="3" |$
| rowspan="3" | 2021–
|- style="text-align:center;"
| Viola Davis
| Michelle Obama
|- style="text-align:center;"
| Michelle Pfeiffer
| Betty Ford
|- style="text-align:center;"
| Pedro Pascal
| The Last of Us| Joel Miller
| $600,000
| $
| 2021–
|- style="text-align:center;"
|Ellen Pompeo
|Grey's Anatomy|Meredith Grey
|$575,000
|$
|2005–
|
|- style="text-align:center;"
| Alec Baldwin
| Dr. Death| Robert Henderson
| $575,000
| $
| 2020–2021
| 
|- style="text-align:center;"
|Norman Reedus
|The Walking Dead|Daryl Dixon
|$550,000
|$
|2017–18
|
|- style="text-align:center;"
|Sofía Vergara
|Modern Family''
|Gloria Pritchett
|$500,000 
|$
|2009–2020
|
|}

Television hosts

Network primetime salaries per season

Daytime annual salaries
'''

News presenters

References

Highest paid stars
Highest paid stars
television stars
 List
television stars